Keiko Cecilia Bonk (born 1954) is an American artist, musician and politician from Hawaii. Bonk co-founded the Hawaii Green Party and was the first person in North America elected to a partisan level office as a member of the Green Party of the United States. In the US most local elected offices are nonpartisan, meaning the candidate is not running as a member of a political party. State and federal offices are partisan, meaning that the candidates represent political parties.  In Hawaii local government, such as county government, traditionally involved declaring your political party. Other people who called themselves "Greens" had been elected to local government offices in the United states prior to Keiko Bonk, but they were  not representing a legally established political party.  In the United States, it is very difficult to win an election in a partisan race if the candidate does not run as a Democrat or Republican. Keiko Bonk was the first person in the United States to run as a representative of the Green Party and beat a Republican and Democrat.

Life
Born July 13, 1954 in Honolulu, her mother was Fumie Matsuoka and father was William Bonk. Bill was a professor at the University of Hawaii.  He was a renowned anthropologist/archeologist who studied Native Hawaiian society, and worked with Kenneth Emory, to date the first arrival of people to the Hawaiian islands.  Fumie was a public school teacher and renowned ceramicist.  Bill and Fumie were both stalwart figures in the progressive wing of the Hawaii Democratic  Party, working for decades to elect many of the states most prominent politicians. Keiko grew up making art with her mother, working on archeological digs with her father, and participating in electoral politics with both. When Keiko co-founded the Hawaii Green Party with University of Hawaii, professor Ira Rhoter, and then decided to run for office herself, the more conservative members of Hawaii's Democratic Party saw the Green Party as a threat to the Democratic Party, and organized to defeat Keiko.  Her father, who worked for the Democratic Governor as the Director of the Office of Culture and Historic Preservation, publicly resigned his position, quit the Democratic Party, and joined the Green party to support his daughter's political career.

Bonk attended Hilo High School on the Island of Hawaii and graduated in 1972.  She then attended the University of Hawaiʻi at Mānoa, where she obtained a bachelor of fine arts degree in 1976.  Bonk went on to achieve a master of fine arts degree from Hunter College in New York City in 1982.

Art
Bonk's first career was as a painter and musician in New York. She sang in the bands "His Masters Voice," and "Cosmic Oven," in the 1980s.

After returning to her home in Hawaii, Bonk continued to play original music and paint. Her first band was the Monkey Wrench Gang.  She then formed a new band called "Kazan", and released a CD called "Save the World" in 2007.

Keiko had a show of her paintings at the Honolulu Academy of Art in 2009. She then spent 15 years caring for her parents and other elderly family members.  Her mother Fumie was the last, and passed died in 2019.  Bonk is rumored to be working on a new album to be released in 2020, and to have a show of her paintings in NYC in 2022.

Politics
Bonk made her national political reputation as an elected official by becoming the first person in North America elected to a partisan level office as a member of the Green Party. She was one of the co-founders of the Green Party in Hawaii.  She was elected to two terms on the Hawaii County Council from 1992 to 1996, and as chair of the council from 1995 to 1996. In 1996 and 2000 she ran for mayor.  In 1996 she was narrowly defeated by the Democratic incumbent, Stephen K. Yamashiro. In 2000 she was defeated by Harry Kim, who ran as a Republican. Bonk worked building the Green Party, and spoke in support of Ralph Nader as the presidential nominee of the Green Party in 1996.

After leaving office Bonk taught art at the University of Hawaiʻi at Hilo, until moving to Honolulu with her second husband Michael Christopher, when he returned to school to pursue a second doctoral degree.  Christopher holds doctorates in sociology and clinical psychology, and has been her political partner even before they married in 1998.  After moving to Honolulu, Bonk was chosen as Executive Director of the Japanese Cultural Center in Honolulu in 2003. She was fired in February 2005 by its board of directors citing "philosophical differences".

Bonk went on to become the campaign coordinator of the Northwestern Hawaiian Islands Network. She promoted Congress' investigation into corruption in Western Pacific Fisheries Management Council, the government advisory council responsible for management of the pacific fishery. Bonk worked as the Executive Director of the Hawaii branch of the Marine Conservation Biology Institute (MCBI).

In 2012 Keiko Bonk was nominated as the Green Party candidate for Hawaii House of Representatives, 20th district. The incumbent in that district, Democrat Calvin Say, was reelected.

References

1954 births
Living people
20th-century American politicians
20th-century American women politicians
21st-century American women politicians
Women in Hawaii politics
Hawaii County Council members
People from Hilo, Hawaii
Musicians from Honolulu
University of Hawaiʻi at Mānoa alumni
Hawaii politicians of Japanese descent
American women of Japanese descent in politics
Artists from Honolulu
Hunter College alumni
Hawaii Greens